Hillary Brooke (born Beatrice Sofia Mathilda Peterson; September 8, 1914 – May 25, 1999) was an American film actress.

Career
A 5′6″ blonde from the Astoria neighborhood of New York City's borough of Queens, Brooke, who was of Swedish ancestry,  started work as a model while attending Columbia University. She spent a year in the United Kingdom, mastering an RP accent that she used in several of her films. She frequently played English women in Hollywood films, and also had such a role in her only British-made film, The House Across the Lake.

Brooke began her acting career in movies, co-starring in two Sherlock Holmes films with Basil Rathbone and Nigel Bruce, Sherlock Holmes Faces Death (1943) and The Woman in Green (1945).

She was a regular on several television series of the early 1950s, playing Roberta Townsend, the glamorous love interest of Margie's father Vern Albright on the 1952–1955 TV series My Little Margie. On The Abbott and Costello Show, produced in the early 1950s and syndicated for many years afterward, Brooke played the role of a straitlaced, classy tenant of the rooming house where the two main characters lived. She was treated with reverence by the duo and was not a target of pranks and slapstick. The love interest of Lou Costello, she always addressed him as "Louis". As with the other main characters, her character's name was her real name. She also appeared in Africa Screams (1949) and Abbott and Costello Meet Captain Kidd (1952) with the comedy team.

Brooke’s other movie credits include Jane Eyre (1943), The Enchanted Cottage (1945), Lucky Losers (1950) with The Bowery Boys, the Alfred Hitchcock thriller The Man Who Knew Too Much (1956), the 3-D film The Maze (1953), and the sci-fi Invaders from Mars (1953).

On September 28, 1957, she played Doris Cole in the second episode of Perry Mason, titled "The Case of the Sleepwalker's Niece". Brooke also played Angela Randall in I Love Lucys "The Fox Hunt", which aired February 6, 1956. She retired from television in 1960 following guest appearances on Richard Diamond, Private Detective as Laura Renault and in Michael Shayne as Greta Morgan.

Personal life
Brooke married Alan Shute in 1936, divorcing in 1940. Brooke then married assistant director Jack Voglin in 1941, and the couple had one child together, Donald, before divorcing in 1948. Brooke was married to Raymond A. Klune, an executive at MGM, from 1960 until his death on September 24, 1988. Through Klune she had two stepchildren, Carol V. Klune and Donald C. Klune.

Brooke was a Democrat who supported Adlai Stevenson's campaign in the 1952 presidential election.

On May 25, 1999, Brooke died from a blood clot in the lung at a hospital in Bonsall, California. She was cremated with her ashes scattered at sea. Her brother, actor Arthur Peterson Jr., died in 1996; For her contribution to the television industry, Hillary Brooke has a star on the Hollywood Walk of Fame at 6307 Hollywood Boulevard.

Quotes
She refused to play dumb blondes. 
"Vacuity will never substitute for a glint of intelligence," she remarked. "However, anyone, man or woman, who is ostentatiously erudite, is lacking in something else or else is just a crashing bore."

"I never thought I was a great actress. Maybe I would have been better if I'd worked harder at it. But I really enjoyed my career and the wonderful people I worked with."

Partial filmography

New Faces of 1937 (1937) – Showgirl (billed as Beatrice Schute)
Eternally Yours (1939) – Blonde on Stage (uncredited)
Two Girls on Broadway (1940) – Second Girl in Powder Room (uncredited)
Florian (1940) – Horsewoman (uncredited)
New Moon (1940) – Party Guest (uncredited)
The Philadelphia Story (1940) – Main Line Society Woman (uncredited)
The Lone Rider Rides On (1941) – Sue Brown
Maisie Was a Lady (1941) – House Guest (uncredited)
Country Fair (1941) – (uncredited)
The Lone Rider in Frontier Fury (1941) – Georgia Deering
Dr. Jekyll and Mr. Hyde (1941) – Mrs. Arnold (uncredited)
Unfinished Business (1941) – Woman (uncredited)
Married Bachelor (1941) – Hillary Gordon (uncredited)
Two-Faced Woman (1941) – Dress Shop Clerk Hotel-Caller (uncredited)
Mr. and Mrs. North (1942) – Party Guest (uncredited)
Sleepytime Gal (1942) – Railroad Station Blonde (uncredited)
To the Shores of Tripoli (1942) – Parade Spectator (uncredited)
 Ship Ahoy (1942) – Hillary (uncredited)
Calling Dr. Gillespie (1942) – Mrs. Brown (uncredited)
Wake Island (1942) – Girl at the Inn (uncredited)
Counter-Espionage (1942) – Pamela Hart
Sherlock Holmes and the Voice of Terror (1942) – Jill Grandis – Driver (uncredited)
Happy Go Lucky (1943) – Wife (uncredited)
The Crystal Ball (1943) – Friend of Jo Ainsley (uncredited)
Sherlock Holmes Faces Death (1943) – Sally Musgrave
Jane Eyre (1943) – Blanche Ingram
Standing Room Only (1944) – Alice Todd
Lady in the Dark (1944) – Miss Bar (uncredited)
And the Angels Sing (1944) – Polish Bride (uncredited)
Practically Yours (1944) – (uncredited)
Ministry of Fear (1944) – Mrs. Bellane #2
The Enchanted Cottage (1945) – Beatrice Alexander
The Crime Doctor's Courage (1945) – Kathleen Carson
The Woman in Green (1945) – Lydia Marlowe
Road to Utopia (1945) – Kate
The Strange Woman (1946) – Meg Saladine
The Gentleman Misbehaves (1946) – Nina Mallory
Strange Impersonation (1946) – Arline Cole
Earl Carroll Sketchbook (1946) – Lynn Stafford
Big Town (1946) – Lorelei Kilbourne
Monsieur Beaucaire (1946) – Mme. Pompadour
 Strange Journey (1946) – Patti Leeds
I Cover Big Town (1947) – Lorelei Kilbourne
Big Town After Dark (1947) – Lorelei Kilbourn
Let's Live Again (1948) – Sandra Marlowe
The Fuller Brush Man (1948) – Mildred Trist
Big Town Scandal (1948) – Lorelei Kilbourne
Africa Screams (1949) – Diana Emerson
Alimony (1949) – Linda Waring
Bodyhold (1949) – Flo Woodbury
Unmasked (1950) – Doris King Jackson
Beauty on Parade (1950) – Gloria Barton
Lucky Losers (1950) – 'Countess' Margo
The Admiral Was a Lady (1950) – Shirley Pedigrew
Vendetta (1950) – Lydia Nevil
Insurance Investigator (1951) – Addie Wilson
Skipalong Rosenbloom (1951) – Square Deal Sal 
Lost Continent (1951) – Marla Stevens
Confidence Girl (1952) – Mary Webb
Abbott and Costello Meet Captain Kidd (1952) – Capt. Bonney
Never Wave at a WAC (1953) – First Lt. Phyllis Turnbull
The Lady Wants Mink (1953) – Evelyn Cantrell
Invaders From Mars (1953) – Mrs. Mary MacLean
The Maze (1953) – Peggy Lord
Mexican Manhunt (1953) – Eve Carter
The House Across the Lake (1954, aka Heat Wave) – Carol Forrest
Bengazi (1955) – Nora Nielson
The Man Who Knew Too Much (1956) – Jan Peterson
Spoilers of the Forest (1957) – Phyllis Warren

References

External links
 

 
 
 WOmWAm Actress Page

1914 births
1999 deaths
American film actresses
American television actresses
Female models from New York (state)
People from Astoria, Queens
Actresses from New York City
20th-century American actresses
California Democrats
New York (state) Democrats
Deaths from blood clot